The British Academy Television Craft Awards is an accolade presented by the British Academy of Film and Television Arts (BAFTA), a charitable organisation established in 1947, which: "supports, promotes and develops the art forms of the moving image – film, television and video games – by identifying and rewarding excellence, inspiring practitioners and benefiting the public."

Having previously been handed out with the British Academy Television Awards, the awards were established in 2000 as a way to spotlight technical achievements, without being overshadowed by the production categories.

Rules
To be eligible for nomination, programmes must be: broadcast in the UK between the eligibility period, on terrestrial, cable, satellite or digital channels; both a financial and creative contribution in the case of an international programme, and have its first broadcast in the UK; an entry for the television awards first (not previously entered for the film or children's awards). The top six programmes and/or individuals in each category are chosen by television voting members and Chapter members in three rounds, to make up the jury shortlist. The shortlist then goes forward to a jury, who decides the top four final nominees and the winners.

Ceremonies
In the following table, the years correspond to the year the ceremony took place, and are held for achievements of the previous year (e.g. the 2000 awards are celebrated for television productions of 1999).

Categories

Current awards
As of 2021, the awards include twenty-one competitive categories:

 Costume Design
 Director: Factual
 Director: Fiction
 Director: Multi-Camera
 Editing: Factual
 Editing: Fiction
 Emerging Talent: Factual
 Emerging Talent: Fiction
 Entertainment Craft Team
 Make-Up & Hair Design 
 Original Music
 Photography: Factual
 Photography & Lighting: Fiction
 Production Design
 Scripted Casting
 Sound: Factual
 Sound: Fiction
 Special, Visual & Graphic Effects
 Titles & Graphic Identity
 Writer: Comedy
 Writer: Drama

A Special Award is also presented, at the discretion of the Television Committee, which "honour[s] an individual or a team of craftspeople for outstanding creative contribution in the craft sector."

Discontinued awards

 Originality (from 1986 to 1999)
 Innovation (from 2000 to 2002)
 New Media Developer (from 2006 to 2007)
 Interactive Innovation (from 2006 to 2010)
 Digital Creativity (from 2011 to 2017)

References

External links
 
 TV Craft section of BAFTA Awards Database

Craft
Craft
British television awards
Awards established in 2000
2000 establishments in the United Kingdom